Betsy Brandt (born March 14, 1973) is an American actress. She portrayed Marie Schrader in Breaking Bad (2008–2013) and its spinoff show, Better Call Saul (2022) and played Heather Hughes in the CBS sitcom Life in Pieces (2015–2019).

Early life
Brandt is a native of Bay City, Michigan. She is of German descent. She graduated from Bay City Western High School in Auburn, Michigan, in 1991. Brandt took an interest in theater from an early age, but unlike many of her peers, she was more interested in directing stage musicals than starring in them. After winning the lead in a high school production of Exit the Body, she shifted her focus to acting.

Brandt received her BFA in acting from the University of Illinois at Urbana–Champaign in 1996. She studied for her MFA at Harvard University's Institute for Advanced Theater Training and studied abroad at the Royal Scottish Academy of Music and Drama, Glasgow. After graduation, Brandt moved to Seattle, Washington, where she worked in theater while appearing in several short films, beginning with Confidence in 1998. She eventually moved to Los Angeles.

Career
In theater, Brandt has acted in performances of Much Ado About Nothing with the Arizona Theatre Company, with the San Jose Repertory Theatre, Beth Henley's Ridiculous Fraud, Julia Cho's The Language Archive with South Coast Repertory, and Next Fall with Geffen Playhouse. She has had guest roles on the television shows Without a Trace, Judging Amy, ER, Boston Legal, The Practice, and NCIS.

From 2008 to 2013, Brandt portrayed Marie Schrader in the AMC drama series Breaking Bad. She auditioned for three different roles before being offered the part of Marie. In 2012, she was cast as Sandy in Parenthood. Brandt was cast as Annie Henry on The Michael J. Fox Show, which premiered in September 2013. Her performance was met with positive reviews. She reprised her role as Marie Schrader for the Better Call Saul series finale.

In 2014, Brandt was cast as one of the lead characters in the ABC series Members Only created by Susannah Grant, but the series did not go forward.

From 2015 to 2019, she starred as Heather Short Hughes in the CBS comedy series Life in Pieces. The series was cancelled after four seasons. In 2020, Brandt was announced to be playing the role of Cleo in the pilot episode of the NBC sitcom Jefferies, which was created by Jim Jefferies and Suzanne Martin. To date, the pilot remains unaired.

Personal life
Brandt is married to fellow UIUC graduate Grady Olsen; they have two children. She gave birth to her second child in 2008 while the second season of Breaking Bad was in production. Brandt and her family reside in Los Angeles.

On June 6, 2010, Brandt was honored as the 2010 Distinguished Alumnus at the Bay City Western High School commencement, and was a featured speaker.

Filmography

Film

Television

Awards and nominations

References

External links

 

20th-century American actresses
21st-century American actresses
American people of German descent
Actresses from Michigan
Alumni of the Royal Conservatoire of Scotland
American film actresses
American stage actresses
American television actresses
Institute for Advanced Theater Training, Harvard University alumni
Living people
People from Bay City, Michigan
University of Illinois College of Fine and Applied Arts alumni
1973 births